"Close Up" is the eleventh episode aired of the first series of UFO - a 1970 British television science fiction series about an alien invasion of Earth. The screenplay was written Tony Barwick and the director was Alan Perry. The episode was filmed between 29 September to 9 October 1969 and aired on the ATV Midlands on 16 December 1970. Though shown as the eleventh episode, it was actually the thirteenth to have been filmed.

The series was created by Gerry Anderson and Sylvia Anderson with Reg Hill, and produced by the Andersons and Lew Grade's Century 21 Productions for Grade's ITC Entertainment company.

Story
SHADO place a B142 tracking probe (launched with NASA Rocket 712) equipped with a newly developed high resolution electron telescopic camera aboard in lunar orbit, during a spacewalk accomplished by Paul Foster and camera developer Lt. John Masters. A UFO is turned back by the SHADO Interceptors from Moonbase and the probe follows it back to its home world. The images the probe returns several months later have no information regarding range or magnification, however, rendering their intelligence value moot.

Cast

Starring
 Ed Bishop — Commander Edward Straker
 George Sewell — Col. Alec E. Freeman
 Michael Billington — Col. Paul Foster
 Gabrielle Drake — Lt. Gay Ellis
 Dolores Mantez — Lt. Nina Barry
 Gary Myers— Capt. Lew Waterman
 Keith Alexander— Lt. Keith Ford
 Ayshea — Lt. Ayshea Johnson

Also starring
 Grant Taylor — Gen. James L. Henderson

Featuring
 Neil Hallett — Dr. Joseph Kelly	
 James Beckett — Dr. Young	
 Alan Tucker — Tracking Station Operator	
 Mark Hawkins — Lt. Gary North	
 Frank Mann — Launch Controller	
 Bob Sherman — First Launch Control Operative	
 Robert Howay — Second Launch Control Operative	
 Clive Endersby — Harry, Launch Control 
 John Levene — Interceptor pilot

Production notes
Locations used for the filming included Neptune House at ATV Elstree Studios, Borehamwood, and Sudbury House, London.

References

External links

1970 British television episodes
UFO (TV series) episodes